Survivor: Caramoan — Fans vs. Favorites is the 26th season of the American CBS competitive reality television series Survivor. The season filmed from May 21 to June 28, 2012, and premiered on February 13, 2013, with a special 90-minute episode. As with Survivor: Micronesia, the first season to have the "Fans vs. Favorites" subtitle, this season initially featured a tribe of 10 returning contestants from previous seasons opposing a tribe of 10 new players. It was the eighth season overall to feature returning players. Production of the show took place in the Caramoan Islands in the Philippines, the same location as the previous season. Participants' applications were due on October 4, 2011, with about 800 chosen for interviews in various states. From these semifinalists, 10 contestants were selected to participate in the show as fans.

John Cochran was named the Sole Survivor in the season finale on May 12, 2013, defeating Dawn Meehan and Sherri Biethman in a unanimous 8–0–0 vote. Malcolm Freberg won $100,000 as the "Sprint Player of the Season", receiving 36% of votes cast over Brenda Lowe, who received 35%.

Casting
According to Jeff Probst, producers had asked both Matt Elrod from Redemption Island and Shannon "Shambo" Waters from Samoa if they wanted to return for another season, but they both turned the offer down, believing that one season was enough for them and not wanting to let Survivor define their lives. The casting crew had also considered asking Lisa Whelchel from Philippines to participate, but realized that asking a mother to participate in back-to-back seasons would be difficult. "Troyzan" Robertson from One World was also considered, but ultimately cut. He would later return on Survivor: Game Changers. Tyson Apostol from Tocantins and Heroes vs. Villains was considered, but casting opted to go in a different direction. He would eventually return the following season, Blood vs. Water, and again for Season 40, Survivor: Winners at War. Stephen Fishbach from Tocantins was also considered but did not make the cut. He would later return for Survivor: Cambodia.

Contestants

The contestants included 10 new players, the "Fans", and 10 former players, the "Favorites", from six previous seasons returning for their second chance at the game. The Favorites include Erik Reichenbach, a "Fan" from the original "Fans vs. Favorites" season, Survivor: Micronesia. Notable "Fan" contestants from this season include future professional stock car racing driver Julia Landauer; and former Miss Missouri USA Hope Driskill, who placed in the top 16 at Miss USA 2011.

Similar to Russell Hantz during Survivor: Heroes vs. Villains, the Favorites did not have an opportunity to see Malcolm's game-play in Survivor: Philippines, due to Philippines and this season being filmed back to back. The two premerge tribes were "Bikal" and "Gota", named for towns in the Caramoan Islands. The merged tribe was known as "Enil Edam", which contestant Malcolm Freberg named after his mother ("Enil Edam" is the name Madeline spelled backwards).

Future appearances
Andrea Boehlke and Malcolm Freberg returned as contestants for their third season in Survivor: Game Changers. John Cochran also made a special appearance in the season's fifth episode, where he gave advice to a contestant who was exiled. 

Outside of Survivor, Brenda Lowe appeared as one of the 26 models for Howie Mandel's show Deal or No Deal. Corinne Kaplan competed in The Amazing Race 31 with two-time Survivor castaway Eliza Orlins. Malcolm Freberg competed on the 2022 USA Network reality competition series, Snake in the Grass.

Season summary
The two tribes were selected prior to the start of the game: Bikal, composed of 10 returning Survivor contestants (the "Favorites"), and Gota, 10 new players (the "Fans"). Bikal won nearly all the challenges and was dominated by an alliance led by Phillip, dubbed "Stealth R Us". Despite this,  dissent existed among Bikal due to Phillip's controlling style of leadership, especially with Corinne and Malcolm, who found the tribe's Hidden Immunity Idol. Brandon was also further put off by Phillip's control and talk behind his back, and at one point broke down and dumped the tribe's supply of rice and beans. Several of the tribe members were emotionally upset at Brandon's display, and the tribe voluntarily forfeited the next challenge so as to vote out Brandon on the spot, though the emotional toll had been taken. The Gota tribe was dominated by an alliance of six led by Sherri, opposed by a minority alliance of four led by Reynold. Reynold's alliance was quickly reduced to Eddie and him, who were spared due to the dwindling tribe needing their strength in challenges.

The tribes were shuffled on day 14, with both new tribes containing four Favorites and three Fans. The significantly weaker new Bikal tribe lost every single challenge, with the Favorite majority sticking together to vote out the new players. Malcolm, now on the Gota tribe, aligned with fellow athletic males Reynold and Eddie to avoid being picked off at the merge.

The tribes merged with eight Favorites and four Fans remaining. The new Enil Edam tribe quickly had two factions emerge: Malcolm and Corinne rallied the remaining Fans together to try to overthrow Phillip, while the rest of the Favorites regrouped under Stealth R Us. Only Sherri and Michael remained from the initial dominant Fans alliance; while Michael chose to align with Corinne's faction, Sherri  and Erik decided to join Stealth R Us due to their distrust of Reynold and Eddie. This put Stealth R Us in the majority and Corinne and Michael were eliminated, leaving only Malcolm, Eddie, and Reynold in the minority. Their eliminations seemed imminent until Reynold won immunity and Malcolm found an additional Idol, which he gave to Eddie. In the hectic Tribal Council that ensued, Malcolm and Eddie played their Idols and Phillip was voted out.

However, their fortune was not to last, and Malcolm and Reynold were subsequently eliminated. While Eddie seemed the likely next target, he was spared when the former members of Stealth R Us decided to turn on one of their own, eliminating strategic threat Andrea with an Idol in her pocket, and Brenda after a kind-hearted gesture at the Loved Ones Challenge put her in a good social position. After Erik was evacuated from the game due to low blood pressure, Eddie was the final player voted out due to his popularity with the jury and having betrayed no one during the game.

Sherri, Cochran, and Dawn ultimately were the final three players. During the Final Tribal Council, Sherri was largely ignored, being perceived as a coattail rider after her original alliance collapsed. While Cochran and Dawn were acknowledged as a pair, Dawn was grilled due to her emotional instability throughout the game while betraying several close allies, whereas Cochran was praised for being able to separate emotions from the game. This led to the jury of eight unanimously voting for Cochran to win.

In the case of multiple tribes or castaways who win reward or immunity, they are listed in order of finish, or alphabetically where it was a team effort; where one castaway won and invited others, the invitees are in brackets.

Episodes

Voting history

Reception
Survivor: Caramoan received mixed to negative reviews from critics. Praise focused on the gameplay after the merge, but a lot of criticism went to the pre-merge and the cast. Andy Dehnart of reality blurred was critical of this season citing a weak cast, ugly moments, and repetitive episodes though acknowledged that the closing episodes were an improvement. Dalton Ross of Entertainment Weekly ranked this season 14th out of 40 saying that the pre-merge was "flat-out grating" but the post-merge was "spectacular". In 2015, a poll by Rob Has a Podcast ranked this season 24th out of 30 with Rob Cesternino ranking this season 16th. This was updated in 2021 during Cesternino's podcast, Survivor All-Time Top 40 Rankings, ranking 30th. In 2020, Survivor fan site "Purple Rock Podcast" ranked this season 21st out of 40 saying that the "pre-merge portion of the game is mediocre to awful, but there are some very interesting and memorable episodes post-merge." Later that same year, Inside Survivor ranked this season 35th out of 40 calling it a "messy, uncomfortable, and nonsensical season, a grim final chapter in the 'Dark Ages' of Survivor."

The gameplay of Cochran received a positive reception. In 2015, in the official issue of CBS Watch magazine commemorating the 15th anniversary of Survivor, Cochran was voted as the seventh greatest player of all time. Additionally, in a 2015 interview shortly before the premiere of the 30th season, host Jeff Probst declared Cochran to be his favorite season winner ever. In 2017, Entertainment Weekly had fans rank the first 34 winners of the series and Cochran placed 11th.

Reunion show controversy
For the first time in Survivor history, contestants that did not make it to the jury phase of the game were not allowed on stage. Of the ten cast members that were allowed to sit on the stage, only six were spoken to (Cochran, Dawn, Andrea, Reynold, Malcolm, and Phillip). While Jeff Probst claimed that the new stage could not accommodate all 18 of the attending contestants, the format change caused controversy amongst the show's fans and fellow contestants, who all felt that it was unfair for the pre-jury contestants to be left out in the audience. This was also the first reunion in Survivor history where two contestants did not have an in-studio appearance on the reunion show. Brenda appeared by satellite, as she was unable to fly out and attend because she was in the late stages of her pregnancy. Brandon also did not attend the reunion, but this was upon a mutual agreement between Brandon and the show's producers following his explosive exit on the show.

Erik, who finished fifth and was not given an opportunity to speak at the reunion, called out the producers for their treatment of the contestants at the reunion. Calling it a farce, he criticized how the reunion show left so many unanswered questions about the other contestants and his own evacuation during the season finale. He also voiced discontent on how the pre-jury contestants were completely left out in favor of featuring the show's previous contestants, like Rob Mariano and Rudy Boesch. Allie, who placed 19th, wrote a post on Facebook about how poorly she was treated at the reunion and shared her thoughts on what actually happened.

References

External links
 Official Survivor: Caramoan Website

26
2013 American television seasons
2012 in the Philippines
Television shows set in the Philippines
Television shows filmed in the Philippines